The International Journal of Modelling and Simulation is a leading peer-reviewed scientific journal covering the fields of modeling and simulation. The editor-in-chief is Jie Shen (University of Michigan–Dearborn). The journal was established in 1981 and is published by Taylor & Francis.

Abstracting and indexing 
The journal is abstracted and indexed by ESCI, CSA Illumina, EI/Compendex, and Inspec.

References

External links 
 

Publications established in 1981
Computer science journals
Taylor & Francis academic journals
English-language journals
Quarterly journals